Fabric of my Life or The Fabric of my Life may refer to:
The fabric of my life : reflections of Helen Frances Gregor, 1987 autobiography of Helen Frances Gregor, Canadian textile artist
Fabric of My Life, the Autobiography of Hannah G. Solomon, 1946 autobiography of Hannah G. Solomon, founder of the National Council of Jewish Women
"The Fabric of My Life", song recorded by several artists as part of The Fabric of Our Lives advertising campaign for cotton